Gazi

Gazi Mohammed Shahjahan Jwel (born 1 February 1960) is a Bangladesh Nationalist Party politician and the former Member of Parliament of Chittagong-11.

Career
Shahjahan was elected to parliament from Chittagong-11 as a Bangladesh Nationalist Party candidate in 1996 and 2001.

References

Bangladesh Nationalist Party politicians
Living people
7th Jatiya Sangsad members
8th Jatiya Sangsad members
1960 births